The Visalia Open was a golf tournament on the LPGA Tour from 1962 to 1965. It was played at the Visalia Country Club in Visalia, California.

Winners
Visalia Open
1965 Clifford Ann Creed

Visalia Ladies' Open
1964 Mickey Wright
1963 Mickey Wright

Visalia Open
1962 Mary Lena Faulk

References

Former LPGA Tour events
Golf in California
Women's sports in California